Andrew Weldon is a Melbourne-based cartoonist. His cartoons have appeared in The Sydney Morning Herald, The Age, The Australian, The Big Issue, Tango, The New Yorker, The Spectator, Private Eye, and on greeting cards. He has written and illustrated children's books including The Kid With The Amazing Head (Penguin 1998) and Clever Trevor's Stupendous Inventions (Penguin 1999). Collections of his gag cartoons, I'm sorry little man, I thought you were a hand puppet and If you weren't a hedgehog... If I weren't a haemophiliac, were published by Allen & Unwin. He has also illustrated in the "Don't Look Now-Series".

External links
Andrew Weldon's personal website
Interview with ABC Kids

Australian editorial cartoonists
Living people
Year of birth missing (living people)